Abaeté Aviação is a domestic airline based in Salvador da Bahia, Brazil. Although the company was established in 1995 it was not authorized to operate regular flights until 2020.

History
Abaeté Aviação can trace its origins to Aerotáxi Abaeté, an air taxi airline established in 1979. In 1994, Aerotáxi Abaeté established a sister company called Abaeté Linhas Aéreas, dedicated to the operation of scheduled services. In 1995 a holding called Abaeté Aviação was created, comprising Aerotáxi Abaeté and Abaeté Linhas Aéreas. Both companies continued to offer services as charter and scheduled airlines and sometimes interchanged aircraft. Abaeté Linhas Aéreas ceased services in 2012 but Abaeté Aviação continued to exist. 

In March 2020, Abaeté Aviação was granted authorization to operate regular flights on its own right.

Destinations
As of April 2022 Abaeté Aviação operated scheduled services to the following destinations in Brazil: 

Maraú (Barra Grande) – Barra Grande Airport 
Morro de São Paulo (Cairu) – Morro de São Paulo Airport
Salvador da Bahia – Deputado Luís Eduardo Magalhães International Airport HUB

Terminated:
Mucugê – Mucugê Airport

Fleet
As of March 2022, the fleet of Abaeté Aviação includes the following aircraft:

Airline affinity program
Abaeté Linhas Aéreas has no Frequent Flyer Program.

See also
Abaeté Linhas Aéreas
List of airlines of Brazil

References

External links

Airlines of Brazil
Airlines established in 1995
1995 establishments in Brazil
Companies based in Bahia